Jaskaran Singh "Karan" Aujla (born 18 January 1997) is an Indo-Canadian singer, rapper and songwriter. He is known for his numerous tracks which were included  in UK Asian chart by Official Charts Company, while seven have featured in the Global YouTube music chart. His debut album BTFU peaked at 20th on Billboard Canadian Albums chart and 34th on New Zealand albums chart, earning him the title of the Largest Digital Artist 2021 on Spotify and had been listed in their Most Popular Artists in Punjabi Music Industry.

Hailing from Ghurala, Ludhiana, Aujla started his career as lyricist for Jassi Gill's "Range", from his album Replay. Then he emigrated to Canada, and wrote lyrics for various other artists including Deep Jandu and Elly Mangat. In 2016, he released his debut song "Property of Punjab" as a lead artist, and started featuring as guest artist in songs. He came into limelight with his tracks like "Yaarian Ch Fikk", "Unity", "Alcohol 2", and "Lafaafe"; subsequently he achieved mainstream popularity in 2018 with "Don't Worry", his first song to enter UK Asian chart. In 2020, his singles "Jhanjar", "Red Eyes" and "Kya Baat Aa" entered top 10 in the chart, while "So Far" entered top 5.

Early life 
Aujla hails from Ghurala village in Ludhiana district of Punjab. He was born as Jaskaran Singh Aujla on 18 January 1997 to father Balwinder Singh Aujla and mother Rajinder Kaur. His parents died when he was nine years old. He was raised by his sisters and uncle after his parents died. Aujla's father, Balwinder Singh Aujla, worked at co-operative society, and he also had writing as a hobby. Thereafter he started writing songs. While studying in 9th standard, Aujla met Jassi Gill in a marriage ceremony and offered him the lyrics of the song Range, which Gill sang and became popular. Aujla received his Canadian permanent residency and emigrated there. He did his high school studies in Burnaby, Canada. Also, he worked part time as a longshoreman in Surrey, British Columbia. His debut song "Cell Phone" with Mac Benipal was released in 2014, it was a commercial failure, and had just a few thousand views. In Canada, he started working with Deep Jandu in his studio at Toronto.

Career

Early career

Aujla started his career along with Deep Jandu and Elly Mangat. He wrote lyrics for many artists including Gill, Mangat, Gagan Kokri, Jazzy B, Bohemia and Sukh-E. His written "Blessings of Bapu", sung by Kokri was well received by audience. Later in 2016, he released his debut song "Property of Punjab" as a lead artist; started featuring and performing raps in the songs. Soon after, he released tracks as a lead artist. His recordings include "Alcohol 2", "Yaarian Ch Fikk", "Shit Talk", "Up & Down", and "Lafaafe".

Rise to fame

Aujla got his breakthrough with the song "Don't Worry", featuring Gurlez Akhtar in it. The song's music video has been viewed over hundred million times on YouTube, and became Aujla's first song to enter UK Asian music chart.

The song was followed by other successes "Rim vs Jhanjhar", "Na Na Na", and "No Need". "Rim vs Jhanjhar" was included in Apple Music 2010s Punjabi essentials playlist. His song "Don't Look" remained in Asian Music Chart for more than twenty-four weeks. The song also appeared in 2019 Apple Music India charts. Also, his songs "Don't Worry", "Hair", "2AM", and "Hint" have been ranked on the chart. In July 2019, Aujla released a title track for the film Sikander 2. His song "Hint" trended for over five days on YouTube in India. Also the song was ranked various charts. The song was debuted at #13 on Asian music chart while at number 75 on Global, 27 in India, 9 in Canada, 14 in Australia, and 5 in New Zealand on YouTube charts respectively. Aujla also become the most-listened artist in Punjab, India in December 2019 on YouTube. His next "Chitta Kurta" was also peaked at number 35 and 9 on Global and Indian YouTube charts respectively. In 2019, Spotify included Aujla in the list of the most popular artists in Punjab.<ref>{{Cite news |last=IANS |date=17 December 2019 |title=Spotify reveals Delhis music trends for 2019 |work=Outlook |url=https://www.outlookindia.com/newsscroll/spotify-reveals-delhis-music-trends-for-2019/1687489 |access-date=14 January 2020}}</ref> Also, he was nominated for Best Singer - Punjabi category at Gaana User's Choice Icons award.

From 2020 to the present

In January 2020, his song "Jhanjar"'s music video was viewed over five million times within 24 hours on YouTube, and topped the trending lists in Australia, Canada, and India. The song was debuted at number 26 on Global and number 8 on India YouTube music charts. Also, it entered top 10 on UK Asian music chart. His next "Red Eyes" peaked at number 8 on UK Asian and also appeared on other YouTube charts. In March 2020, his mixtape titled Geetan Di Machine was released unofficially on various music platforms, which consists of his unreleased and leaked songs, the album was removed later. In April 2020, his song "Sheikh"'s both audio and the music video were leaked. Within the few hours of leak Aujla announced the release of the original audio and music video. In May 2020, his four singles "Red Eyes", "Sheikh", "Chitta Kurta", and "Jhanjar" appeared simultaneously on UK Asian chart. In the same month, Aujla on his Instagram live stated that he is working on his debut album. In June 2020, his "Let 'em Play" peaked at number 14 on Apple Music chart, and debuted at number 15 on UK Asian chart. In July 2020, "So Far" became his first track to enter top 5 on UK Asian chart.

His "Haan Haige Aa" was viewed around eleven million times in twenty-four hours. In the same month, his written "G.O.A.T." from Diljit Dosanjh's album of the same name was released, it became a major commercial success. Also, the song debuted at number 13 on New Zealand Hot Singles by Recorded Music NZ, and topped UK Asian, UK Punjabi, and Top Triller Global chart by Billboard, and became his first song to appear on any New Zealand and Billboard official chart. It debuted at number one on Apple Music chart in India. In August 2020, "Kya Baat Aa" starring Tania in its music video, was released with no prior announcement. The song peaked at number one on Spotify chart in India. His next song "Adhiya" released on YouTube in October 2020. His song "Chithiyan", launched 10 November 2020 by Speed Records, gathered 32 million views within a fortnight of being released. In December, he collaborated with Bohemia, The Game and J. Hind, for a single "Ek Din". He released his single, "Hukam", on 4 February 2021 on YouTube through Rehaan Records. He went on to collaborate with Dilpreet Dhillon for the fifth time for the latter's song "Jatt Te Jawani" released on 23 April 2021.

Later in 2021, he announced his debut album named "BacTHAfucUP" (B.T.F.U.) produced by Tru Skool. In June he released Intro and in July he released album's first song "Chu Gon Do". He released full album on 15 September 2021. The album came in Trending and peaks on many mainstream charts on Apple Music, iTunes and Spotify.

On 16 September 2021, Karan Aujla became India's Biggest Digital Artist with world ranking of 38. His debut album charted at #6 on Spotify Global Debut Album. On 29 September 2021, His Album BTFU charted on #19 on Billboard Top Canadian Albums.

In 2022, he released his collaboration "YKWIM" with famous rapper KR$NA and announced new EP "Way Ahead" at the end of song.

Personal life

In 2019, he was engaged to his girlfriend Palak. That year, he also got a tattoo of his mother's face on his right arm. He also has his father's tattoo too on the same arm. In June 2019, news channels stated that Aujla was attacked in Surrey, Canada on 8 June 2019. Later, a Punjab-based gang took responsibility of attack but later denied. On 9 June 2019, Aujla himself declared the news as rumour spread by news channels. However, other sources confirmed the attack. The gangster Sukhpreet Budda, who took responsibility for the attack was arrested by Interpol in November 2019 in Armenia. In March 2020, he got tattoos of freedom fighters Bhagat Singh and Udham Singh on his left arm. Aujla in an interview expressed his willingness to collaborate with the American rapper 50 Cent and the Canadian rapper Drake.

 Controversies & feuds 
Aujla had a rivalry with Sidhu Moose Wala. Both had been replying to each other through their songs. Both the artists have been criticised for songs promoting violence. Elly Mangat, who has previously worked with both the artists disclosed in an interview that the dispute between both began when Sidhu's video targeting Aujla in his song was leaked to Aujla's management, and they threatened attacking Sidhu. Following the incident, both started targeting each other on social media. The rivalry was resolved temporarily till Karan Aujla released a diss-track "Lafaafe", followed by Moose Wala's "Warning Shots". Aujla in an interview stated that he didn't write the track "Lafaafe", and didn't reveal anything about their rivalry. After Moose Wala's death, Aujla paid tribute with the song "Maa".

In February 2020, Chandigarh Police advised him not to sing any of his song promoting violence, guns or drugs during his concert at DAV College, Chandigarh. He said, "I followed the instructions of senior police officers."

In November 2019, Aujla was investigated for violating traffic rules upon his arrival at Chandigarh, India, and was fined for five traffic violations.

In April 2021, Karan Aujla visited Ludhiana central Jail and met the Superintendent of the Central Jail Rajeev Arora. Later he was flaunted for visiting the prison in violation of the security and Covid protocols and also it was claimed that he met drug kingpin Gurdeep Rano of Khanna. But it was cleared by Superintendent Rajeev Arora that he visited only to meet him and sat only few minutes in his office and later they moved in to Arora's official residence near jail building.

In September 2021, after the release of his debut album BacTHAfucUP (B.T.F.U.), a complaint was filed over the song "Sharab", against himself, Harjit Harman and record label, Speed Records for comparing women to alcohol, drugs and guns in the song. Later the issue was resolved through communication with the complainant.

Other events
Karan Aujla launched his own clothing brand named "Hukam Clothing", on 25 November 2021.

Discography

Studio albums

 BacTHAfucUP'' (2021)

Accolades

See also 

 Karan Aujla discography

Notes

References

External links 
 
 

1997 births
Living people
Singers from Punjab, India
Punjabi rappers
Punjabi-language lyricists